Francke Horn (born 24 May 1999) is a South African rugby union player for the  in Super Rugby and the  in the Currie Cup. His regular position is flanker.

Horn was named in the  squad for the Super Rugby Unlocked competition.

On 5 July 2021, Horne captained the Lions against the British & Irish Lions at Emirates Airline Park where they lost 14-56.

References

South African rugby union players
1999 births
Living people
Rugby union flankers
Golden Lions players
Lions (United Rugby Championship) players